Ozyptila gertschi is a crab spider species with Holarctic distribution. It is considered new to the fauna of Latvia since 2009.

References

External links 

gertschi
Spiders of Europe
Spiders described in 1944
Holarctic spiders